Holt Canyon, originally called Meadow Canyon or Meadow Valley, is a valley in Washington County, Utah. Its mouth lies at an elevation of eaters where it enters the Escalante Valley.

History
Meadow Canyon was the northern part of the long well watered meadow with excellent grazing, called Mountain Meadow that was used by the merchants and drovers on the Old Spanish Trail and later by travelers on the wagon road that followed the older trail, called the Mormon Road. Later the canyon was renamed Holt Canyon after James Holt, who came in 1867 to visit his brother-in-law, a settler of Hamblin, Utah.

References

Canyons and gorges of Washington County, Utah
Canyons and gorges of Utah
Old Spanish Trail (trade route)
Mormon Road